EKFC may refer to:

East Keilor Football Club
East Kilbride F.C.
Emirates Flight Catering